John Warner (21 September 1911 – 1980) was a Welsh footballer who played as a wing half.

In his early days, he played for Swansea Town, and he went on to make 135 Football League appearances for the Welsh club before moving to Manchester United for 1938–39. He made over 100 league appearances for the Old Trafford club, and then transferred to Oldham Athletic.

Warner moved to Rochdale for the 1951-52 season, making 21 league appearances for the club. He then became manager of Rochdale for the 1952-53 season.

He also made two appearances for Wales, along with one wartime cap.

References

1911 births
1980 deaths
Welsh footballers
Wales international footballers
Association football wing halves
English Football League players
Swansea City A.F.C. players
Manchester United F.C. players
Oldham Athletic A.F.C. players
Rochdale A.F.C. players
Rochdale A.F.C. managers
Welsh football managers